KYBR (92.9 FM, "Real Country 92.9") is an American radio station licensed to Espanola, New Mexico, covering northern New Mexico including Santa Fe and Taos. It broadcasts a classic country music format and is owned by Rio Chama Broadcasting.

After experimenting with a Regional Mexican format, the station returned to a country format that combines older country hits with newer songs by traditional-sounding artists in July 2015.

References

External links
KYBR official website

Mass media in Taos, New Mexico
Radio stations established in 1996
YBR
Country radio stations in the United States